Daniel Idema is a Canadian professional poker player from South Delta, British Columbia.

In 2007 Dan won the $2500 buy-in British Columbia Poker Championship main event, beating out a field of 643 players to win the $410,000 first prize.

In 2011, Idema beat out a field of 152 players to take down the $10,000 buy-in Limit Holdem Championship at the 2011 World Series of Poker claiming his first gold bracelet and $378,642.

In 2013, he won his second gold World Series of Poker bracelet in Event #39, which was the $1,500 buy-in Seven Card Stud hi/low.

World Series of Poker Bracelets

Hockey
Idema played for three years in the Western Hockey League with the Medicine Hat Tigers and one year in the Ontario Hockey League with the Saginaw Spirit. In 2004, he anchored the Medicine Hat Tiger defence corps that included future NHL players Cam Barker and Kris Russell that played for the Memorial Cup in Kelowna, British Columbia. Dan finished his junior career with the Surrey Eagles of the BCHL and ended up with a total of 12 goals and 25 assists over his four years in junior hockey.

References

Canadian poker players
World Series of Poker bracelet winners
Year of birth missing (living people)
Living people